Architecture & Morality is the third studio album by English electronic band Orchestral Manoeuvres in the Dark (OMD), released on 6 November 1981 by Dindisc. Inspired by religious music, the group sought to broaden their musical palette by utilising elaborate choral samples, the Mellotron, and other new instruments to create a more naturalistic, emotive sound. The artwork was designed by longtime OMD collaborator Peter Saville, along with associate Brett Wickens, while its title was derived from the book Morality and Architecture by David Watkin.

Architecture & Morality reached number three on the UK Albums Chart, and was a top-10 entry across Europe. The record met with lukewarm reviews, but garnered acclaim from critics and other artists in the following years. It has been recognised as a seminal album of its era and the synth-pop genre, appearing in rankings of the best records of 1981 and the wider decade. Architecture & Morality has also featured in "all-time" lists, including the book, 1001 Albums You Must Hear Before You Die.

The record became a commercial success, selling over four million copies and spawning three international hit singles – "Souvenir", "Joan of Arc" and "Maid of Orleans" – which together sold eight million copies. OMD have staged multiple tours based around the album.

Background

During the initial sessions for Architecture & Morality, OMD were looking for a new musical direction. Frontman Andy McCluskey, a longtime atheist, told how the band "found a lot of influence in the emotional power of religious music". McCluskey informed Melody Maker at the time, "I haven't gone and 'got God'... It's just trying to understand why people need religion and believe in it." The group spent two months recording at The Manor, Shipton-on-Cherwell, with additional recording completed at the band's own Gramophone Suite in Liverpool. Mixing took place at Mayfair, London. Instrumentalist Martin Cooper left and re-joined the group during the making of the album, missing the bulk of the sessions. During his absence he formed Godot with former OMD session musician David Hughes.

A catalyst in the development of OMD's new sound was Hughes using the band's studio to manipulate choral samples he had recorded. Musically, the album is noted for making liberal use of those samples, as well as the Mellotron, a mechanical tape-replay keyboard. The group introduced other new instruments including prominent guitars on opening track "The New Stone Age", whose sound was intended to startle the OMD audience. All of these measures combined to produce a more naturalistic, emotive sound than on previous OMD releases.

According to the album's credits, its title was suggested to the band by Martha Ladly (formerly of Martha and the Muffins), who had read the 1977 book Morality and Architecture by David Watkin. Ladly, who was also a designer, was the girlfriend of Peter Saville, the album's sleeve designer, at the time. McCluskey felt the title Architecture & Morality represented the interplay between the human and mechanical aspects of OMD: "We had the 'architecture', which was the technology, the drum machines, the rigid playing, the attempt to break out of the box by playing specifically crafted sounds, and the 'morality', the organic, the human, the emotional touch, which we brought naturally."

"Souvenir" was the first track to be written for the album. "Sealand" was named after the Royal Air Force Sealand base on the Wirral, although the song is actually about an oil refinery; it is also a nod to the Neu! song, "Seeland". The sample-heavy title track was compiled in the studio over a three-day period. "The Beginning and the End" was an older composition that the band had attempted to record previously, but had shelved due to being unsatisfied with the results. The songs avoided the verse-chorus-verse format, utilising lengthy instrumental passages and substituting choruses with synthesizer lines. Lyrics were largely inspired by historical figures and events, including Joan of Arc, after whom two songs were named. The tenth through sixteenth tracks of the remastered edition are bonus tracks and were B-sides from the album's three singles, except "Gravity Never Failed", which was an out-take from the Architecture & Morality sessions (its original title, "Georgia", was transferred to another song on the record). This track was envisaged as a single, but was not released until it featured as the B-side of "Dreaming" (1988). "Of All the Things We've Made", and a completed version of "The Romance of the Telescope (Unfinished)", would appear on OMD's next album, Dazzle Ships (1983).

The cover artwork was produced by Peter Saville and associate Brett Wickens. Inspirations included "art movements like The Circle, and... mid-century iconic furniture like [Le] Corbusier and [Alvar] Aalto".

Singles
Architecture & Morality yielded three singles, all of which reached the top five of the UK Singles Chart: "Souvenir" (number three), "Joan of Arc" (number five), and "Maid of Orleans (The Waltz Joan of Arc)" (number four), a retitled "Joan of Arc (Maid of Orleans)". Two singles were also successful in a variety of territories, with "Souvenir" and "Maid of Orleans" each charting at number one in various European countries; the latter became Germany's biggest-selling single of 1982. "Joan of Arc" was only released in the UK. The three singles sold eight million copies combined.

Dindisc proposed "She's Leaving" as a fourth single but the group refused, believing this would over-exploit the album; the label did proceed with a small-scale release in the Benelux region. OMD later regretted their decision, attributing it to being young and pretentious.

Critical reception

Architecture & Morality met with a lukewarm critical response. Lynden Barber of Melody Maker wrote, "I don't believe the Orchs even care about this record... the style is the same, the content profoundly different, the onslaught of emptiness, frivolity disguised by furrowed brows, a new brand of meaninglessness." Boston Phoenix journalist M. Howell said the record "gives off the dry stench of self-importance" and would have been more aptly titled "Mortician & Morality". David Fricke of Rolling Stone observed an "awkward mix of dreamy romanticism and spatial, Pink Floyd-ian abstractions", concluding that "too much sincerity and not enough spunk... make for attractive but dull fare." Record Mirrors Daniela Soave cautioned that the album "requires more effort on the listener's part", adding, "Although I had misgivings initially, Architecture & Morality is no disappointment."

Other critics were unapologetically favourable. Dave McCullough of Sounds gave a five-star review in which he referred to Architecture & Morality as OMD's "best album yet" and a "classic in the making", while the Belfast Telegraphs Jim Cusack called it an "excellent album" by a band with "higher interests and concepts in music than most others of their genre." The Evening Express stated, "'Souvenir' and the beautiful 'Joan of Arc' are obvious standouts but really any seven of the nine tracks are potential hits." Architecture & Morality was included in Billboards "Recommended LPs".

"We didn't think it got the respect it deserved", said McCluskey in 1983. "We put a lot into it and we really loved it... anything which undermines our own unstable balance creates a problem for us." Sean O'Neal of The A.V. Club told how OMD responded to lacklustre reviews of the album by "pursu[ing] a darker, more defiantly experimental direction on its 1983 follow-up, Dazzle Ships—only to have the critics belatedly declare [Architecture & Morality] a masterpiece." In particular, a 1984 article in Melody Maker offset the magazine's unflattering contemporary review, with Helen Fitzgerald labelling the record "the first true masterpiece of the Eighties."

AllMusic's Ned Raggett wrote, "Combining everything from design and presentation to even the title into an overall artistic effort, this album showed that OMD was arguably the first Liverpool band since the later Beatles to make such a sweeping, all-bases-covered achievement." Mark Lindores of Classic Pop asserted, "Merging the machinations of German electronica with warm Merseyside melodies and otherworldly choral samples... OMD struck the perfect balance between experimentalism and commercial appeal." In Record Collector, John Doran observed an "astonishing record" whose content ranges from atmospheric love songs to the "propulsive and [Gary] Numanesque 'The New Stone Age'" and the sample-heavy "Georgia"; Doran also had praise for Saville's "austere and iconic" cover art. Author Lori Majewski said, "Architecture and Morality is so original, so special, so sublime, that if there were no other new wave bands to speak of, the entire genre could still hang its hat solely on that record."

Legacy

Architecture & Morality has appeared in lists of 1981's greatest albums, being ranked no. 1 by The Morning News. The magazine added that "it's stood as the blueprint for synth-pop; few have approached an improvement upon its design". The record placed fourth in Tylko Rock writer Tomasz Beksiński's top 10 albums of the New Romantic era, was voted 13th in Classic Pops reader poll of the "Top 100 Albums of the 1980s", and was included in Mojos 80 favourite albums of the decade. It also featured in critic Mark Fisher's "Top 100 British Albums", Phantom FM's "Top 500 Albums of All Time", and the book, 1001 Albums You Must Hear Before You Die. In genre-specific lists, Architecture & Morality was ranked the eighth-greatest electropop record by Classic Pop, and the 35th-best new wave album by Ultimate Classic Rock, who called it "crucial" to synth-pop's MTV-era transformation from "industrial-town dirges to sleek, love-struck modern pop music".

Musicians Moby, Frost, Tor Lundvall, and The Divine Comedy's Neil Hannon have named Architecture & Morality one of their favourite albums, while Anohni, Spacemen 3's Peter Kember, and X Marks the Pedwalk's Sevren Ni-Arb have cited it as a pivotal record from their youth. Moby said, "I mean it's not hard to overdo the hyperbole, but it's a perfect album, so cohesive, and every song perfectly speaks to the other song, the unapologetic emotional quality of it is really inspiring. Even the artwork by Peter Saville, everything about it is perfectly crafted." Jamie Stewart of Xiu Xiu labelled the record a "masterpiece", while Charlatans vocalist Tim Burgess staged a Twitter listening party of the album, describing it as "genius" and "absolutely beautiful". Architecture & Morality has received further endorsements from Kevin Hearn of Barenaked Ladies, Alex Naidus of The Pains of Being Pure at Heart, and Jonn Penney of Ned's Atomic Dustbin, who selected it as the record he would place on a Christmas wish list. The Alan Partridge universe has incorporated songs from the album, with the title character noting that it features "some classic electro-rock".

The subject of multiple "classic album" analyses, Architecture & Morality is recognised as a seminal record of the synth-pop genre and the 1980s decade. It has been the focus of three tours: as well as touring in support of the record upon its release, OMD included all of its songs in the main set of their 2007 comeback tour (which spawned the 2008 live album and DVD, OMD Live: Architecture & Morality & More), and also staged a 40th anniversary tour in 2021. The record has sold more than four million copies worldwide.

Track listing
All songs by Andy McCluskey and Paul Humphreys, except where noted

Notes
 "Navigation" is edited some 30 seconds shorter at the end; the full original length version (3:26) is available on Navigation: The OMD B-Sides.
 Disc one of the 2007 collector's edition is the same as the 2003 remastered CD.

Personnel
 Paul Humphreys – synthesisers, piano, Mellotron, acoustic and electronic percussion, organ, rhythm programming, radios, melodica and vocals
 Andy McCluskey – synthesisers, Mellotron, guitar, bass, rhythm programming, acoustic and electronic percussion, French horn, organ and vocals
 Malcolm Holmes – drums, electronic and acoustic percussion, bass synthesiser
 Martin Cooper – saxophone
 Michael Douglas - synthesizers, piano, organ

Charts

Weekly charts

Year-end charts

Certifications

References

Notes

External links
 Album lyrics at official OMD website

1981 albums
Albums produced by Mike Howlett
Orchestral Manoeuvres in the Dark albums
Virgin Records albums